A fever hospital or isolation hospital is a hospital for infectious diseases such as scarlet fever and smallpox.  Their purpose is to treat affected people while isolating them from the general population.  Early examples included the Liverpool Fever Hospital (1801) and the London Fever Hospital (1802). other examples occurred elsewhere in the British Isles and India

The hospitals became common in England when laws were passed at the end of the 19th century, requiring notification of infectious diseases so that public health officers could ensure that the patients were isolated.  During the 20th century, immunisation and antibiotics reduced the impact of these diseases.  After the introduction of the National Health Service in 1948, the hospitals were wound down so that, by 1968, there were few left.

The concept of a hospital dedicated to isolation and care during an outbreak of an infectious disease remains relevant in the 21st century, to the extent that public health efforts cannot reduce the risk of outbreaks to zero (although they remain critical, and more than pay for themselves, by reducing the risks to low non-zero levels). The COVID-19 pandemic has provided examples of temporary dedicated hospitals or (especially) hospital wings or annexes (for example, COVID-19 hospitals in the United Kingdom), sometimes known as fever clinics.

England and Wales
The first hospital specifically for smallpox was the London Smallpox Hospital, founded in 1741.  The first specialist hospital for other infectious diseases was the Liverpool Fever Hospital which was founded in 1801.  Fever hospitals or "houses of recovery" were then established in other major cities – Chester, Hull, London, Manchester, Newcastle upon Tyne and Norwich.  These were mainly for treatment of typhus which was common.  By 1879, isolation hospitals of some sort were established in 296 local authorities, out of a total  of 1,593 – about 18.5%.  As the germ theory of disease and nature of infection became established, more fever hospitals were established so that, by 1914, they were the most common sort of hospital.  The numbers and size of the different sort of institutions at that time were

After the London Fever Hospital was established in 1802, six more hospitals were established in London by the Metropolitan Asylums Board.  These were designed with two separate buildings – one for smallpox patients and one for sufferers from other infectious diseases: cholera, diphtheria, dysentery, measles, scarlet fever, typhoid fever, typhus and whooping cough.

In London, there were protests and legal action against fever hospitals by local residents who were concerned about the risk of infection.  Precautions were taken, such as disinfection of ambulances, but it was found that the incidence of smallpox increased near smallpox hospitals.  Siting of the hospitals next to rivers, so that transport of patients could be limited to ambulance steamers was found to reduce this.  Ships, moored on the Thames at Long Reach, were also used as isolation hospitals.

Notification
The Infectious Disease (Notification) Act 1889 required that local authorities be notified of the occurrence of such infectious diseases.  The medical officer of health was then empowered to isolate the patients to prevent spreading.  Well-to-do patients could be isolated at home but poorer people lacked the facilities and space for this.  The requirement for isolation thus drove the need for provision of hospitals for this purpose.  These measures were compulsory in the London area and were made compulsory in the rest of the country by a similar act of 1899.

Cross infection
Cross infection was a significant issue because patients with different diseases might be put in the same ward and share facilities such as towels.  Isolation hospitals were then criticised as places "where a person goes in with one infectious disease and catches all the rest."  Patients returning from such hospitals might then spread the acquired infections to members of their family.  These were called return cases and they could result in complaints and lawsuits.  A major difficulty was a lack of understanding of scarlet fever, which was the most common disease at that time.  The nature of the disease and the way in which it was transmitted was uncertain.  To prevent return cases, hospitals tried extending the period of isolation and giving patients disinfectant washes with formalin or Lysol when discharging them.

List of hospitals

England
 Catherine-de-Barnes Isolation Hospital, located in the Midlands, this was the UK's national isolation hospital from 1966 and the world's last victim of smallpox died there in 1978
 Eastern Fever Hospital, Homerton
 Grove Fever Hospital, Tooting and the Fountain Fever Hospital, which was built as an annexe in 1893 for an outbreak of scarlet fever
 Monsall Fever Hospital, Manchester
 Northern Convalescent Fever Hospital, Enfield
 Park Fever Hospital, Hither Green
 Western Fever Hospital, Fulham
 Brumby Isolation Hospital, Scunthorpe, North Lincolnshire

India
 Sir Ronald Ross Institute of Tropical and Communicable Diseases, also known as the Fever Hospital

Ireland
 Cork Street Fever Hospital, Dublin
 Ruins of a Fever Hospital in Oxpark townland, Cloughjordan, County Tipperary

See also
 Lazaretto
 Leper colony
 Pest house
 Sanitorium

References

Fever hospitals
Isolation (health care)
Hospitals by medical condition